Simanjiro District is one of the six districts of the Manyara Region of Tanzania.  It is bordered to the north by Arusha Region, to the north east by Kilimanjaro Region, to the south east by Tanga Region, to the south by Kiteto District, to the south west by Dodoma Region and to the west by Babati Rural District. The district headquarters are located in Orkesumet. According to the 2012 Tanzania National Census, the population of Simanjro District was 178,693. Simanjiro district is endowed with gemstones with being the only location on the planet that has tanzanite. Also Simanjiro was were the first tsavolite was discovered.

Administrative subdivisions
As of 2012, Simanjiro District was administratively divided into 17 wards.

Demographics
The 2012 Tanzanian Census reported that the district had a population of 178,693, with an average household size of 4.6 people. The 2002 Tanzanian Census reported that the district had a population of 141,676, with an average household size of 4.3 people.

Many of the district's inhabitants are ethnic Maasai. Many of the district's Maasai population are illiterate, have no formal education, and are practicing Christians.

Economy 
The area is home to the national gem of Tanzania, tanzanite. A rare gem only found in Mererani hills in Merereani ward in with Simanjiro District, Manyara Region. Masai millionai based in Arusha region, Saniniu Laizer made headlines in 2020 after mining three stones and selling them for approximately $5.4 million. Simanjiro's economy revolves around mining of tanzanite, however the district has not been able to reap the economic benefits of such a lucrative industry  

Due to the district's predominant Maasai population the second largest industry is beef pastoral, with a 1994 report states that 71,531 Maasai in the district practice pastoralism. There are a significant number of extension agents in the district who sell agricultural information.

Media 
Orkonerei Radio Service, a Maasai language radio station located in the town of Terrat.

References

Districts of Manyara Region